Sula is a 1973 novel by American author Toni Morrison, her second to be published after The Bluest Eye (1970).

Plot summary
The novel begins when the construction of a golf course is announced, the site being the destroyed remnants of what used to be the Bottom. 

The Bottom is a black neighborhood on the hill above the fictional town of Medallion, Ohio. In the first section of the novel, the origin story of the Bottom is revealed as well as how it got its name: a white farmer promised freedom and a piece of Bottom land to his slave if he would perform some difficult chores for him. Upon completion, the farmer regrets his end of the bargain. Freedom was easy, the farmer had no objection to that, but he did not want to give up the land. He tells the slave he was very sorry that he had to give him valley land, for he had hoped to give him a piece of the bottom land. The slave said he thought valley land was bottom land, to which the master said land on the hill, not the valley, was bottom land, rich and fertile" (Morrison 5). This is obviously untrue, but it is the story that black people told to illuminate the fact that white people's racism and lies have created this topsy turvy world in which up is down and down is up. "The white people lived on the rich valley floor... and the blacks populated the hills above it, taking small consolation in the fact that every day they could literally look down on the white folks" (5).

The story is organized by chronological chapters labeled with years. In "1919," the first named character, handsome Shadrack, a previous resident of the Bottom, returns from World War I a shattered man, suffering from shell shock or PTSD and unable to accept the world he used to belong in. Living in the outskirts of town and attempting to create order in his life, he develops methods such as keeping his shack in hospital-grade neatness. Another method is the invention of National Suicide Day, which exists on January 3 to counter and compartmentalize the constant death he saw at war, and is essentially invitation for anyone that plans to die within the next year, to die on that day. Never assimilating, he curses even at children and whites, has regular acts of indecency, but also does odd jobs and sells fish to the townspeople and is begrudgingly woven into the urban fabric, which is this town's version of acceptance.
 
In "1920" and "1921," the narrator contrasts the families of the children Nel Wright and Sula Peace, who both grow up with no father figure. Nel, the product of a mother knee deep in social conventions, grows up in a stable home. Nel is initially torn between the rigid conventionality of her mother Helene Wright, who dislikes Sula's family instantly, and her inherent curiosity with the world, which she discovers on a trip. Her vow to venture out when she is older is juxtaposed by the reader being informed that not once did she leave the Bottom after that trip. This experience ultimately prompts Nel to begin a friendship with Sula. The Peace family is the opposite: she lives with her grandmother Eva and her mother Hannah, both of whom are seen by the town as eccentric, loose, yet Hannah was genuinely loved by all men, and Eva was very respected by all women. Their house serves as a home for three informally adopted boys and a steady stream of boarders. The extremely strained relationship between Hannah and Eva is revealed. 
 
Despite their differences, Sula and Nel become fiercely attached to each other in adolescent friendship. They share every part of their lives. This includes a memory of an accidental traumatic event; One day, they playfully swing a neighborhood boy, Chicken Little, around by his hands. Sula loses her grip and he falls into a nearby river and drowns. They do not tell anyone of the event, and though Sula grieves with guilt, Nel feels a light happiness, which is implicitly revealed to be unspoken pride, because she has secretly decided that the event is Sula's fault and that she does not share the blame at all. What complicates things is Shadrack's shack, which has a direct view of the incident. To find out if he saw, Sula visits it alone and is surprised at its orderliness, but she is unable to ask the question through her tears. He comforts her and she runs away, accidentally leaving her belt, which Shadrack hangs on his wall as a sole ornament and memorandum of his only visitor.

One day, Hannah tries to light a fire outside and her dress catches fire. Eva sees this happening from upstairs and jumps out the window in an attempt to smother the flames to save her daughter's life.  An ambulance comes, but Hannah dies en route to the hospital, and her mother is injured as well.  The incident proves Eva's fierce love for her daughter despite previous tension. Sula, however, had stood on the porch and watched her mother burn.  Other residents of the Bottom suggest perhaps Sula was stunned by the incident, but Eva believes she stood and watched because she was "interested". 
 
Nel chooses to marry, which implicitly breaks the bond of the girls who promised to share everything. Sula follows a wildly divergent path and lives a life of ardent independence and total disregard for social conventions. Shortly after Nel's wedding, Sula leaves the Bottom for a period of 10 years. She has many affairs and attends college. When she returns to the Bottom and to Nel, now a conventional wife and mother, they reconcile briefly. 

The rest of the town, however, regard Sula as the very personification of evil for her blatant disregard of social conventions. Their hatred in part rests upon Sula's affairs with the husbands of townspeople, though Hannah did this very thing with much less criticism. The hate is crystallized when the husbands start a rumor that Sula slept with white men, successfully turning the whole town against her, though it is implied at the end that Sula was not hurt by anyone's opinions except Nel's. Ironically, the community's labeling of Sula as evil actually improves their own lives, as her presence in the community gives them the impetus to live harmoniously with one another, as well as treat each other better. For instance, Sula's affairs give the wives a reason to soothe the bruised egos of their husbands, while Sula's lack of family at her age is scorned by all the women and causes them to be better mothers. What confuses the town even more is how Shadrack, who treats everyone poorly, always treats Sula with chivalry.   

The final nail in the coffin of their friendship is an affair Sula has with Nel's husband, Jude, who subsequently abandons Nel. Just before Sula dies in 1940, they reconcile half-heartedly. With Sula's death, the harmony that had reigned in the town quickly dissolves, as the couples begin bickering again and the women complain about motherhood again. Sula dies alone, and the community doesn't even attend her funeral. Shadrack, whose PTSD has faded enough for loneliness to crawl back in, is the only one saddened by her death.

Nel never remarries and instead smothers her children, repeating every one of her mother's mistakes. The Bottom slowly dissolves after Sula's death, becoming a different place. Nel visits Eva out of cordiality in 1965 in a home for old people, where Eva tells her that she knew about her and Sula drowning Chicken Little. Nel replies that the blame was just on Sula, but later realizes that the girls shared everything back then. 

Nel says goodbye to Sula at her gravestone, finally  realizing that all this time she thought she was missing Jude, when really it was Sula, and cries in grief as she recalls the years spent without her.

Characters
Sula Peace: the childhood best friend of Nel, whose return to the Bottom disrupts the whole community. The main reason for Sula's strangeness is her defiance of gender norms and traditional morality, symbolized by the birthmark "that spread from the middle of the lid toward the eyebrow, shaped something like a stemmed rose," which, according to some psychoanalytic readings, is a dual symbol with both phallic and vaginal resonance.
Eva Peace: Sula's grandmother, who is missing one leg. Though the circumstances are never fully explained, it is suggested that she purposely put it under a train in order to collect insurance money to support her three young children after her husband left her. She has a peculiar relation with her children. She passes on to Hannah and then Sula a need for male attention. 
BoyBoy: Sula's grandfather, who leaves Eva for another woman.
Hannah Peace: Sula's mother; Eva's eldest daughter.  Hannah is a promiscuous and care-free woman who later burns to death in front of her mother and daughter. Her daughter Sula witnessed the fire but did nothing, while her mother tried to save her by jumping on top of her from her bedroom window.
Eva (Pearl) Peace: Sula's aunt; Eva Sr.'s youngest daughter and middle child.
Ralph (Plum) Peace: Sula's uncle; Eva's son and youngest child.  Plum was a WWI veteran and a heroin addict.  Eva burns him alive with kerosene because of his mental instability.
Helene Wright: Nel's straight-laced and clean mother. Though the daughter of a prostitute, she was raised by her devoutly religious grandmother, Cecile.
Nel Wright: Sula's best friend (can also be considered a main protagonist) who does not want to be like her mother because she will never be reduced to "custard" and she will not be humiliated by other people as her mother is. Nel is the opposite of Sula: she decided to marry, have children and stay in the Bottom when she became an adult. She is Sula's best friend as they are children and then their relation turned into something more complex when Jude left Nel for Sula. 
Shadrack: A paranoid shell-shocked WWI veteran, who returns to Sula and Nel's hometown, Medallion.  He invents National Suicide Day.
Jude Greene: Nel's husband, who leaves Nel due to a love affair with Sula.
Ajax (Albert Jacks): Sula's confidant and lover.
Tar Baby (Pretty Johnnie): A quiet, cowardly, and reserved partially or possibly fully white man who rents out one of the rooms in the Peace household. It is believed that Tar Baby has come up to the Bottom to drink himself to death.
The Deweys: three boys, each about one year apart from one another in age, who were each nicknamed "Dewey" by Eva. Their real names are never written in the novel, and after the introduction of these characters, the three were referred as one being, thus Morrison's use of a lowercase "d" in "dewey" for the rest of the novel.
Chicken Little: The little boy who drowns when Sula accidentally threw him into the river.

Major themes

Motherhood

Sula is packed with formal moves against social structures. It is Helene's grandmother, Cecile, who stands in as a mother figure and her primary caretaker. Eva, Sula's grandmother, operates a boarding house and is about the business of her own version of mothering, "directing the lives of her children, friends, strays, and constant stream of boarders" (30).  In Sula, relationships between mothers and daughters do not seem to be predicated on shared affection and a duty to protect one's offspring. For example, Hannah, Sula's mother is overheard in conversation with her friends, "You love her, like I love Sula. I just don't like her. That's the difference." (57) Hannah's comment does gesture toward a sense of duty, but differs from Jacobs' as it implies an absence of a desire to mother. When Hannah challenges her mother Eva about expressions of love toward her, Eva responds by reminding Hannah of the sacrifices that she has made for her. Love and mothering to Eva is about sacrifice and self-preservation, "…what you talkin' 'bout did I love you girl I stayed alive for you can't you get that through your thick head or what is that between your ears, heifer?" (69)

Doubleness

Sula demonstrates numerous doubles or parallels between the novel's characters. For example, Sula and Eva both kill men (Sula kills Chicken Little; Eva kills Plum). The death of Chicken Little results in a closed casket funeral (64). Likewise, for Hannah, "the casket had to be kept closed at the funeral" (77). Chicken died by water, Hannah died by fire. Nel watches Chicken die by drowning, according to Eva at the later scene in the nursing home (168). Sula watches Hannah die in flames (78). Both Plum and Hannah —brother and sister— die by fire (Plum is burned to death by Eva, Hannah dies from her injuries after catching fire by accident).

Symbolism

Though Morrison's of symbolism is continuous through the novel, the most important symbol is the birthmark Sula has over her eye. The darkening of it over the years represents her maturity and gradual defiance of social conventionality. The appearance of the birthmark is utilized to reveal how each character perceived Sula. Nel thought it looked like a rose, symbolizing love, friendship, and female beauty; Jude thought it was a snake, symbolizing deception and seduction, which the rest of the town agreed with; Perhaps even more significant than Nel's perception of the mark is Shadrack's, who thought it looked like a tadpole. He was the only person that thought of her as harmless.

Literary significance and criticism
Sula was integral to the formation of black feminist literary criticism. In her 1980 essay "New Directions for Black Feminist Criticism," Black feminist literary critic Deborah McDowell responded to Smith's challenge by acknowledging the need for a black feminist criticism and calling for a firmer definition of black feminism.

In her essay "Boundaries: Or Distant Relations and Close Kin", Deborah McDowell draws on the critical practices of Hortense Spillers and Hazel Carby and reads Sula from a poststructuralist perspective, urging black women critics to "develop and practice […] critical approaches interactively, dialogically" instead of viewing "black female identity as unitary essence yielding an indigenous critical methodology." As she points out, the ambiguity of Sula as a character subverts traditional binary oppositions, and "transcends the boundaries of social and linguistic convention." The decentering and temporal deferral of the character who lends the novel its title similarly "denies the whole notion of character as static essence, replacing it with the idea of character as process." This "complex set of dynamics" forces the reader to "fill in the gaps" as well as to "bridge the gaps separating [them] from the text" and therefore makes them active participants in the meaning-making process.

The beauty of Morrison's narrative is its complexity and its ability to illustrate the fluidity and valences of the black female subject as captured in the quotidian.

Ferguson elaborates on the potential of Sula as "an opportunity to formulate politics. " Sula, Ferguson argues, gave black lesbian feminists "a model of alternative subjectivities." The novel became a useful tools to invent new ways of thinking. By illustrating alternative social relationships, the novel provided a way for women of color feminists to imagine new possibilities outside of the constraints of nationalism.

Television series
In May 2022, it was reported that HBO will adapt the novel into a television limited series. The project will be created and written by Shannon M. Houston.

References

External links
 Sula study guide, themes, quotes, teacher resources

1973 American novels
Novels by Toni Morrison
Novels set in Ohio
Alfred A. Knopf books
African-American novels